Barrett Crumen  (26 March 1878 – 19 September 1968) was a New Zealand seaman and swagger. He was born in Latvia on 26 March 1878.

References

1878 births
1968 deaths
Latvian emigrants to New Zealand
Emigrants from the Russian Empire to New Zealand